Edgar Morin (born Edgar Nahoum; 8 July 1921) is a French philosopher and sociologist of the theory of information who has been recognized for his work on complexity and "complex thought" (pensée complexe), and for his scholarly contributions to such diverse fields as media studies, politics, sociology, visual anthropology, ecology, education, and systems biology. As he explains: He holds two bachelors: one in history and geography and one in law. He never did a Ph.D. Though less well known in the anglophone world due to the limited availability of English translations of his over 60 books, Morin is renowned in the French-speaking world, Europe, and Latin America.

During his academic career he was primarily associated with the École des hautes études en sciences sociales (EHESS) in Paris.

Biography 

At the beginning of the 20th century, Morin's family migrated from the Ottoman city of Salonica (Thessaloniki) to Marseille and later to Paris, where Edgar was born. He is of Judeo-Spanish (Sefardi) origin.

When the Germans invaded France in 1940, Morin assisted refugees and joined the French Resistance. As a member of the French Resistance he adopted the pseudonym Morin, which he continues to use. He joined the French Communist Party in 1941.

In 1945, Morin married Violette Chapellaubeau and they lived in Landau, where he served as a lieutenant in the French Occupation army in Germany.

In 1946, he returned to Paris and gave up his military career to pursue his activities with the Communist Party. Due to his critical posture, his relationship with the party gradually deteriorated until he was expelled in 1951 after he published an article in L'Observateur politique, économique et littéraire. In the same year, he was admitted to the National Center of Scientific Research (CNRS).

Morin founded and directed the magazine  (1954–1962). In 1959 his book Autocritique was published. The book was a sustained reflection on his adherence to, and subsequent exit from, the Communist Party, focusing on the dangers of ideology and self-deception.

In 1960, Morin travelled extensively in Latin America, visiting Brazil, Chile, Bolivia, Peru and Mexico. He returned to France, where he published L'Esprit du Temps, a work on popular culture.

That same year, French sociologist Georges Friedmann brought him and Roland Barthes together to create a Centre for the Study of Mass Communication that, after several name changes, became the Edgar Morin Centre of the EHESS, Paris.

Also in 1960 Morin and Jean Rouch coauthored the film Chronique d'un été, an early example of cinéma vérité and direct cinema.

Beginning in 1965, Morin became involved in a large multidisciplinary project, financed by the Délégation Générale à la Recherche Scientifique et Technologique in Plozévet.

In 1968, Morin replaced the incumbent professor of philosophy, Henri Lefebvre, at the University of Nanterre. He became involved in the student revolts that began to emerge in France. In May 1968 he wrote a series of articles for Le Monde that tried to understand what he called "The Student Commune." He followed the student revolt closely and wrote a second series of articles in Le Monde called "The Revolution without a Face," as well as coauthoring Mai 68: La brèche with Cornelius Castoriadis and Claude Lefort.

In 1969, Morin spent a year at the Salk Institute for Biological Studies in La Jolla, California. Jonas Salk invited him under the recommendation of Jacques Monod and John Hunt, with the sole imposed condition of learning. It was there, in this "breeding ground for Nobel Prizes" that he familiarized himself with systems theory. He read Henri Laborit, James Watson, Stéphane Lupasco, Bronowski, and was introduced to the thought of Gregory Bateson and the "new problematic in ecology".

In 1983 he published De la nature de l’URSS, which deepened his analysis of Soviet communism and anticipated the perestroika of Mikhail Gorbachev.

In 2002 Morin participated in the creation of the International Ethical, Scientific and Political Collegium. Also that year, he made a trip to Iran with Dariush Shayegan.

Following a meeting at a music festival in Fez, Morocco, in 2009, Morin became close with sociology professor Sabah Abouessalam. The couple married in 2012. He collaborated with her on the text, L'homme est faible devant la femme (Presses de la Renaissance, 2013), and in 2020 on Changeons de voie - Les leçons du coronavirus (Denoël, 2020).

Philosophical work
In addition to being the UNESCO Chair of Complex Thought, Morin is known as a founder of transdisciplinarity and holds honorary doctorates in a variety of social science fields from 21 universities (Messina, Geneva, Milan, Bergamo, Thessaloniki, La Paz, Odense, Perugia, Cosenza, Palermo, Nuevo León, Université Laval à Québec, Brussels, Barcelona, Guadalajara, Valencia, Vera Cruz, Santiago, the Catholic University of Porto Alegre, the Universidade Federal do Rio Grande do Norte, and Candido Mendes University (Rio de Janeiro)).

The University of Messina in Sicily, Ricardo Palma University in Lima, and the Centre National de la Recherche Scientifique (CNRS), the French National Research Center in Paris, have established research centers based on his transdisciplinary methods and philosophy. In addition, the Multiversidad Mundo Real Edgar Morin, a university based on his work, was established in Mexico. Morin did not embrace the French postmodern or poststructuralist movements, instead pursuing his own research agenda. As a result, US academics did not transport his theories into disciplinary discourses in same fashion as they did Foucault's, Derrida's and Galinon-Mélénec's. Morin's work spans scholarly and popular literature, and he has appeared on the cover of multiple publications including Sciences Humaines and a special issue of Le Monde.

According to Alfonso Montuori in "Edgar Morin: A partial introduction"  "The 6 volume Method is perhaps Morin’s culminating work, a remarkable and seemingly inexhaustible treasure trove of insights, reflection, and a real manual for those who are interested in broadening the nature of human inquiry. Drawing on cybernetics, information theory, systems theory, but also integrating all the work he has done before, from the work on imagination in his research on movies to his profound reflections on death, Method integrates Morin’s journey and provides the reader with an alternative to the traditional assumptions and method of inquiry of our time."
Morin was elevated to the dignity of Knight Grand Cross of the Legion of Honour, in the Honours List of  Bastille Day 2021 by French President Macron.

Works (selection)

Books 
 1946 : L'An zéro de l'Allemagne, Paris, Éditions de la Cité Universelle.
 1947 : Allemagne notre souci, Paris, Éditions Hier et Aujourd'hui.
 1948 : Une cornerie, Paris, Éditions Nagel.
 1948 : L'Homme et la Mort, Paris, Éditions Corrêa.
 1956 : Le Cinéma ou l'homme imaginaire, Paris, Éditions de Minuit.
 1957 : Les Stars, Paris, Le Seuil.
 1959 : Autocritique, Paris, Le Seuil.
 1962 : L'esprit du temps. Essai sur la culture de masse, Paris, Grasset-Fasquelle.
 1967 : Commune en France. La métamorphose de Plodémet, Paris, Fayard.
 1968 : Mai 68, La Brèche, Paris, Fayard.
 1969 : La Rumeur d'Orléans, Paris, Le Seuil.
 1969 : Introduction à une politique de l'homme, Paris, Le Seuil.
 1969 : Le vif du sujet, Paris, Le Seuil.
 1970 : Journal de Californie, Paris, Le Seuil.
 1973 : Le Paradigme perdu : la nature humaine, Paris, Le Seuil.
 1974 : L'unité de l'homme, Paris, Le Seuil. 
 1977 : La Méthode, Paris, Le Seuil.
 1981 : Pour sortir du XXe siècle, Paris, Nathan.
 1982 : Science avec conscience, Paris, Fayard.
 1983 : De la nature de l’URSS, Paris, Fayard.
 1984 : Le Rose et le noir, Paris, Galilée.
 1984 : Sociologie, Paris, Fayard.
 1987 : Penser l'Europe, Paris, Gallimard.
 1988 : Mais..., Paris, Édition Neo/Soco Invest.
 1989 : Vidal et les siens, Paris, Le Seuil.
 1990 : Introduction à la pensée complexe, Paris, ESF.
 1993 : Terre-Patrie, Paris, Le Seuil.
 1994 : Mes démons, Paris, Stock.
 1995 : Les Fratricides : Yougoslavie-Bosnie (1991-1995), Paris, Édition Arléa.
 1995 : Une année sisyphe, Paris, Le Seuil.
 1997 : Comprendre la complexité dans les organisations de soins, Paris, ASPEPS.
 1997 : Une politique de civilisation, Paris, Arléa, Paris.
 1997 : Amour, Poésie, Sagesse, Paris, Le Seuil.
 1999 : L'Intelligence de la complexité, Paris, L'Harmattan.
 1999 : Relier les connaissances, Paris, Le Seuil.
 1999 : Une tête bien faite : Repenser la réforme, réformer la pensée, Paris, Le Seuil.
 2000 : Les Sept Savoirs nécessaires à l'éducation du futur, Paris, Le Seuil.
 2000 : Dialogue sur la nature humaine, Paris, L'Aube.
 2001 : Journal de Plozévet, Bretagne, 1965, Paris, L'Aube.
 2002 : Dialogue sur la connaissance. Entretiens avec des lycéens, Paris, La Tour d’Aigues.
 2002 : Pour une politique de civilisation, Paris, Arléa.
 2003 : La Violence du monde, Paris, Édition du Félin.
 2003 : Éduquer pour l’ère planétaire, la pensée complexe comme méthode d’apprentissage dans l’erreur et l’incertitude humaine, Paris, Balland.
 2003 : Université, quel avenir ?, Paris, Éditions Charles Léopold Mayer.
 2003 : Les Enfants du ciel : entre vide, lumière, matière, Paris, Odile Jacob.
 2004 : Pour entrer dans le XXIe siècle, Paris, Le Seuil.
 2005 : Culture et Barbarie européennes, Paris, Bayard.
 2006 : Itinérance, Paris, Arléa.
 2006 : Le Monde moderne et la question juive, Paris, Le Seuil.
 2007 : L'An I de l'ère écologique, Paris, Tallandier.
 2007 : Où va le monde ?, Paris, L'Herne.
 2007 : Vers l'abîme, Paris, L'Herne.
 2008 : Mon chemin, Paris, Fayard.
 2008 : Vive la politique ?, Grenoble, Forum Libération de Grenoble.
 2009 : Crises, Paris, CNRS.
 2009 : La Pensée tourbillonnaire, Paris, Éditions Germina.
 2009 : Edwige, l'inséparable, Paris, Fayard.
 2010 : Pour et contre Marx, Paris, Temps présent. 
 2010 : Ma gauche, Paris, Éditions François Bourin.
 2010 : Comment vivre en temps de crise ?, Paris, Bayard.
 2011 : La Voie : pour l'avenir de l'humanité, Paris, Fayard.
 2011 : Conversation pour l'avenir, Paris, L'Aube.
 2011 : Dialogue sur la connaissance : Entretiens avec des lycéens, Paris, L'Aube.
 2011 : Mes philosophes, Paris, Germina. 
 2011 : Le Chemin de l'espérance, Paris, Fayard.
 2012 : La France est une et multiculturelle. Lettre aux citoyens de France, Paris, Fayard.
 2013 : Mon Paris, ma mémoire, Paris, Fayard.
 2013 : La rencontre improbable et nécessaire (with Sabah Abouessalam), Paris, Presses De La Renaissance.
 2014 : Notre Europe : Décomposition ou métamorphose, Paris, Fayard.
 2014 : Au péril des idées, Paris, Presses du Châtelet.
 2014 : Enseigner à vivre. Manifeste pour changer l’éducation, Paris, Actes Sud-Play Bac Éditions.
 2015 : Avant, pendant, après le 11 janvier, Paris, L'Aube.
 2015 : Impliquons-nous ! Dialogue pour le siècle, Paris, Actes Sud.
 2015 : Penser global : L'humain et son univers, Paris, Robert Laffont.
 2016 : Pour l'esthétique, Paris, Robert Laffont.
 2016 : Pour une crisologie, Paris, L'Herne.
 2016 : Ecologiser l'Homme, Paris, Lemieux Éditeur.
 2017 : Connaissance, Ignorance, Mystère, Paris, Fayard.
 2017 : L’Île de Luna, Paris, Actes sud.
 2017 : L'Urgence et l'Essentiel, Paris, Éditions Don Quichotte.
 2017 : Le temps est venu de changer de civilisation, Paris, L'Aube.
 2017 : Où est passé le peuple de gauche ?, Paris, L'Aube.
 2018 : Pour résister à la régression, Paris, L'Aube. 
 2018 : Le Cinéma : Un art de la complexité, Paris, Nouveau Monde Éditions.
 2019 : La Fraternité, pourquoi ?, Paris, L'Aube.
 2019 : Chronique d'un été, Paris, L'Aube.
 2019 : Les souvenirs viennent à ma rencontre, Paris, Fayard.
 2020 : Quelle école voulons-nous ? La Passion du savoir (with Jean-Michel Blanquer), Paris, Éditions Odile Jacob.
 2020 : Sur la crise : Pour une crisologie suivi de Où va le monde ?, Paris, Éditions Flammarion, coll. Champs.
 2020 : Changeons de voie : Les leçons du coronavirus (in collaboration with Sabah Abouessalam), Paris, Éditions Denoël.
 2020 : L'entrée dans l'ère écolgique, Paris, L'Aube.
2021 : Frères d’âme, entretien avec Pierre Rabhi under questions of Denis Lafay. Paris, L’Aube.
2021 : Leçons d’un siècle de vie, Paris, Édfitions Denoël, ISBN 978-22-07163-07-8.
2022 : Réveillons-nous !, Paris, Éditions Denoël, ISBN 978-22-07165-25-6.

Articles 
 "The Noise and the Message". Telos 33 (Fall 1977). New York: Telos Press.

Conferences 
 2005, "Restricted complexity, general complexity".

Honours

See also
Constructivist epistemology
Systems thinking
Autopoiesis
Anti-foundationalism
Language of thought hypothesis

References

External links 

 Edgar Morin writings and interview in the UNESCO Courier
 Interview with Edgar Morin at The Global University Network for Innovation (GUNI)
 WISE 2013 Special Address, a lecture in English at the World Innovation Summit for Education
 The Persecution of Edgar Morin by Doug Ireland
 "La réalité semi-imaginaire de l'homme" , last chapter of the book "Cinéma ou l'homme imaginaire" (1956)
 Edgar Morin: Seven Complex Lessons in Education video  with English subtitltes
 'In Praise of Complex Thought' CNRS News Edgar Morin Interview with Francis Lecompte July 2019 

1921 births
Living people
French centenarians
Men centenarians
Writers from Paris
French sociologists
20th-century French Sephardi Jews
Jewish philosophers
Jewish sociologists
Jews in the French resistance
Epistemologists
Frontist Party politicians
French Communist Party politicians
Unified Socialist Party (France) politicians
Transdisciplinarity
20th-century French philosophers
Commandeurs of the Légion d'honneur
Grand Officers of the Ordre national du Mérite
Commandeurs of the Ordre des Arts et des Lettres
French National Centre for Scientific Research scientists
French male writers
Communist members of the French Resistance
21st-century French philosophers
French Army personnel of World War II
French Army officers